Alvin Roubal Luedecke (10 October 1910 – 9 August 1998) was a United States Army Air Forces general during World War II. He commanded the Armed Forces Special Weapons Project after the war. After retiring from the Air Force in 1958, he was General Manager of the United States Atomic Energy Commission, Deputy Director of the Jet Propulsion Laboratory and President of Texas A&M University.

Early life and career
Alvin Roubal Luedecke was born in Eldorado, Texas, on 1 October 1910, the oldest of eight children of John H. Luedecke, a rancher, and his wife Lizzie. He grew up on the family ranch. He earned a Bachelor of Science degree in chemical engineering from the Texas A&M in 1932.

Luedecke was commissioned as a second lieutenant in the field artillery reserve on 28 May 1932, and was posted to Camp Bullis, Texas, on Reserve Officers' Training Corps duty. He became a flying cadet on 21 February 1933. After completing his flight training at the Primary Flying School at Randolph Field, Texas, and the Advanced Flying School Bomber course at March Field, California, and Hamilton Field, California, he received a reserve commission as a second lieutenant in the United States Army Air Corps on 20 February 1935.

Luedecke was posted to the 11th Bombardment Squadron at Hamilton Field. The next year he became group operations and intelligence officer of the 7th Bombardment Group there. On 1 October 1938 he was commissioned as a regular second lieutenant in the  Army Air Corps, and was posted to the 25th Bombardment Squadron at France Field in the Panama Canal Zone.

World War II
Luedecke was assistant military attaché for Air to Costa Rica, Guatemala, Honduras, El Salvador, Panama and Nicaragua from 23 January 1940 to 19 August 1942. He then became  executive air officer at the field office of the Military Intelligence Services, Quarry Heights in the Panama Canal Zone. There he was promoted to captain on 1 February 1942, major on  19 November 1942, and lieutenant colonel on 5 January 1943. That month he returned to the United States as chief of the Operations Branch, Air Control Group, American Intelligence Command at Miami Beach, Florida. The next month he became chief of the Latin American Branch, American Intelligence Command. For his service in Central America, he was awarded the Colombian Order of Boyaca.

On 12 May 1943 he was  appointed deputy commander of the 39th Bombardment Group, based at Davis-Monthan Field, Arizona. He became executive officer of the 16th Bombardment Operations Training Wing there on 27 June, with a promotion to colonel on 22 July 1943. In August 1943 he was appointed Chief of the Operations and Training Section of the Army Air Forces in the India-Burma Sector of the China-Burma-India Theater. On 18 August 1944 he was promoted to brigadier general at the age of 33. He became Deputy Chief of Staff in November 1944. In July 1945 he was made Assistant Chief of Air Staff for Plans, Operations, Training and Intelligence in the China Theater. For his service in China, he was awarded the Chinese Order of the Cloud and Banner. He was also given a British mention in despatches and made a Commander of the Order of the British Empire. He was awarded the Legion of Merit on 8 January 1944, with an oak leaf cluster on 25 October 1945, the Bronze Star Medal on 19 November 1945, and the Commendation Ribbon on 29 May 1946. He was also awarded an honorary Legum Doctor (LLD) degree by Texas A&M in 1946.

Cold War
Luedecke returned to the  United States in February 1946, and was assigned to the Joint War Plans Committee in Washington, D.C., as the senior Army Air Force member. On 22 October 1947 he became Assistant Director of the Joint Strategic Plans Group. On 14 June 1949 he was posted to the Military Liaison Committee of the United States Atomic Energy Commission as executive military secretary. On 16 March 1951 he became the Air Force Deputy Chief of the Armed Forces Special Weapons Project. After the Chief of the Armed Forces Special Weapons Project, Major General Herbert B. Loper, had a heart attack and was forced to retire, Luedecke stepped up to become chief, with the rank of major general.

Starting with Operation Crossroads in 1946, the practice had been to form a joint task force to plan and conduct each series of nuclear tests in the Pacific. When they became more frequent, the Joint Chiefs created Joint Task Force 7 as a permanent body. Luedecke assumed command of  Joint Task Force 7 on 1 April 1957. On 10 June he was succeeded as Chief of the  Armed Forces Special Weapons Project by Rear Admiral Edward N. Parker, but remained commander of Joint Task Force 7. As such, he was responsible for the planning, preparation and conduct of Operation Hardtack I and Operation Hardtack II. For his services, he was awarded the Air Force Distinguished Service Medal.

Later life
Luedecke retired from the Air Force in 1958 to replace Kenneth D. Nichols as General Manager of the Atomic Energy Commission. In 1964 Luedecke was appointed Deputy Director of the Jet Propulsion Laboratory. Over the next three years he worked on the unmanned Ranger, Mariner, Surveyor and Voyager space exploration programs. For his services to NASA, he was awarded the NASA Exceptional Service Medal in 1968.

That year he returned to Texas A&M as an associate dean of engineering, engineering research coordinator and associate director of the Texas Engineering Experiment Station. He became acting president for seven months after the death of Earl Rudder in 1970. He then served as executive vice president for six years.  A science building on the campus was named in his honor in 1994.

He died in San Antonio, Texas, on 8 August 1998 and was buried at Fort Sam Houston National Cemetery in San Antonio. He was survived by his wife Isabelle, son, Alvin R. Luedecke Jr., daughters Jan Lee Maynard and Miriam Luedecke, and six sisters.

Notes

References

 
 
 
 

1910 births
1998 deaths
Honorary Commanders of the Order of the British Empire
Recipients of the Air Force Distinguished Service Medal
Recipients of the Legion of Merit
People from Eldorado, Texas
Texas A&M University alumni
United States Air Force generals
United States Army Air Forces pilots of World War II
Presidents of Texas A&M University
Texas A&M University faculty
Burials at Fort Sam Houston National Cemetery
Military personnel from Texas
20th-century American academics